Ivančna Gorica Stadium, also known as Ivančna Gorica Sports Park, is a multi-purpose stadium in Ivančna Gorica, Slovenia. It is used mostly for football matches and is the home ground of the Slovenian Third League team NK Ivančna Gorica.

The stadium currently holds 1,500 spectators.

See also
List of football stadiums in Slovenia

References

External links
Stadioni.org profile

Football venues in Slovenia
Multi-purpose stadiums in Slovenia
Sports venues completed in 1973
20th-century architecture in Slovenia